Hemmo Paskiainen (approximately "Hemmo the Shithead") is a Finnish comic strip drawn by Ave Koskela, originally published in the Pahkasika magazine. Ave Koskela is the pen name of brothers Ari and Vesa Koskela, who are also famous for the strips Pallopäät and Koskisen perhe in the Pahkasika magazine. Ari draws the comics and Vesa writes them. The brothers have been drawing Hemmo Paskiainen since 1984. The strips are half a page to four pages long and deal with the life of Armas Paskiainen and his teenage son Hemmo. Hemmo has two friends, Stegu and Löka.

At first the strip was about Armas Paskiainen's son Hemmo and was named accordingly. Contrary to popular belief, the name Hemmo Paskiainen does not come from the Juice Leskinen song "Ajan henki". Vesa Koskela heard the name from his friend, who said there was a man named Hemmo Paskiainen living in Lapland. Paskiainen's father started appearing more and more in the strip, until it was finally renamed Armas Paskiainen after him. There have been twelve Hemmo Paskiainen albums. The original albums have not been reprinted, and most of them have been out of print for a long time.

The first seven albums were published by Banana Press Oy. Paskiainen returned to the Finnish comics market after a hiatus of twelve years in December 2007, when the Turku-based published Zum Teufel! started publishing new albums of Paskiainen comic strips and coloured versions of old strips in hardcover compilation albums.

Characters and themes
The main character Armas Paskiainen is a middle-aged, short and slick man with a narrow black moustache. He dresses in a suit jacket, a white dress shirt, a necktie, shined shoes and straight trousers both for work and for free time and lives in a terraced house apparently in the Helsinki capital region. He spends his summers at his cottage in the archipelago and is at odds with his neighbours. He is also a landowner with possession of his own forest, but always fetches a Christmas tree from his neighbour's forest as he is stingy. Paskiainen was born in 1956 and is 47 years old. The idea of most strips is that Paskiainen finds out an easy way to get rich, but this ends up in a socially unacceptable situation or in an accident. Paskiainen has for example ended up in jail and hanged himself at the end of some strips. Paskiainen is completely helpless in his adult life and can not even operate a can opener without ending up with wounds requiring express care.

Paskiainen has a wife named Hilma, who is seldom seen and whose appearance varies somewhat. In some earlier strips her name was Unelma. Hilma is a stereotypically bossy and light-going housewife, who enjoys shopping, gossiping and decorating her home. She most often nags about her husbands extramarital affairs. Armas Paskiainen has a habit of bringing a mistress, usually some beautiful blonde, to his marital bed after his wife and son have gone to visit his mother-in-law for their vacation. Sometimes the strip has even shown pornographic panoramas based on Finnish war history. These summer romances are often short-lived, because Paskiainen's mistresses tire of him either because of his bad manners or because his wife returns home in the middle of her vacation to pick up something she forgot (and catches her husband in the act).

Paskiainen has worked in several jobs representing different society classes ranging from Swedish-speaking news anchor to competitive skier and astronomer, but most of the time he is an ordinary proletariat, such as an office worker or a deputy errand boy. His bourgeois superiors are wealthy, cigar-smoking capitalists, who are portrayed through a resentful view of social realism. Armas Paskiainen (or a person resembling Armas Paskiainen during a religious act of duty) has also sought to indoctrinate the youth into a Christian view of the world, but the attempt ended up in masturbation.

Armas Paskiainen is not the best possible father to his son. He seeks to protect his son from alcohol, sex, violence and all kinds of capitalist evil, but himself sets a bad example by drinking, swearing and reading magazines denigrating women. Paskiainen's favourite literature seems to be the parodical pamphlet "Donald Duck's horrifying times in Peking" and the pornographic magazine Kallu, whose name is a portmanteau between the real-world men's magazines Kalle and Jallu. Armas Paskiainen has sometimes physically disciplined his son and he loses his temper very easily. His son gets his impressions through other means and is more knowledgeable about the "evils of the world" than Armas Paskiainen thinks or reassures himself of thinking.

Armas Paskiainen and his son with his friends are drawn in a different style than most of the other characters. Many of the one-time minor characters in the Paskiainen strip are drawn very realistically, and their body proportions are similar to those of real-life humans. However, the main character is drawn so that he only reaches to the waist of the other characters. Paskiainen has an oblong "snout" and his head takes up one third of his entire body. All the furniture and items in Paskiainen's apartment are inexplicably just the right size for both him and the other characters.

Armas Paskiainen's son Hemmo views his father as a hopeless failure. Hemmo is a lazy petty criminal and also probably a video game addict. He skips school and spends his nights on the street with his two friends, drinking beer and smoking cigarettes. Hemmo has a missing front tooth and unkept hair, and he wears shorts, sneakers and a T-shirt sporting a wide horizontal stripe. Löka doesn't talk very much and he is often portrayed with a cigarette in his mouth. The spiky-haired Stegu is a few years younger than his friends. He believes in Santa Claus and does not always get all of Hemmo's jokes. When spotting his father Armas Paskiainen, Hemmo exclaims "Juku iskä!" ("Gosh dad!") followed by a sarcastic comment, but Stegu and Löka call him by a more honourable name Herra P ("Mister P"). Hemmo never misses an opportunity to humiliate his father in public. In one strip were Armas Paskiainen is in the Korkeasaari zoo as the sole representative of his species Homo sapiens, Hemmo throws rotten bananas at him.

References

External links
 Official site
 Zum Teufel!
 Kirjaverkko listing of Hemmo Paskiainen albums

Finnish comic strips